Clan MacLaren is a Highland Scottish clan.

History

Origins of the clan

The chiefly house of MacLaren is said to be descended from Loarn mac Eirc, believed to be a ruler of the kingdom of Dál Riata. In Scottish Gaelic the clan name is Clann Labhruinn. However the eponymous founder of the MacLarens is generally given as Laurence, Abbot of Achtow in Balquhidder, who lived during the thirteenth century. Balquhidder was part of the ancient princedom of Strathern whose heraldry is shown in the heraldry of the MacLarens. The heraldry borne by the clan suggests that they descend from a cadet branch of the dynasty of the Earls of Strathearn.

There is also a tradition that the MacLarens fought at the Battle of the Standard under Malise I, Earl of Strathearn, for David I of Scotland.

Wars of Scottish Independence

Three names identified as belonging to the Clan MacLaren are found in the Ragman Rolls of 1296, giving allegiance to Edward I of England. These are Maurice of Tiree, Conan of Balquhidder and Leurin of Ardveche. During the Wars of Scottish Independence it is probable that the Clan MacLaren fought for Robert the Bruce at the Battle of Bannockburn, under the standard of Malise, Earl of Strathearn in 1314, where the English were defeated. The last Gaelic Earl of Strathearn was deprived of his title in 1344 when the MacLarens came under pressure from their more powerful neighbours.

15th and 16th centuries

In 1468 the Clan MacLaren fought in support of the Clan Stewart of Appin at the Battle of Stalc. The MacLarens also fought alongside the Stewarts of Appin at the Battle of Black Mount in 1497 or 1498.
Balquhidder passed into the hands of the Crown and in 1490 a Stewart was appointed the royal ballie. (see: Stewart of Balquhidder). Then in 1500 James IV of Scotland granted the lordship to Janet Kennedy, his mistress, and the chief of the Clan MacLaren found that his lands had become part of another barony. Balquhidder would later pass to the Clan Murray of Atholl.

The persecution of the Clan Gregor by the Clan Campbell drove the MacGregors from their own lands into Balquidder where the Clan MacLaren lacked the power to stop them. As a result, the MacGregors plundered the lands of the MacLarens killing eighteen MacLaren households; men, women and children, and taking over the homesteads of those they killed. The MacLarens appealed to the Campbells for help, but they demanded that the MacLarens acknowledge them as their feudal superiors as the price of protection. However it appears that the Crown continued to regard the MacLarens as an independent clan as they are listed in the Acts of Parliament in 1587 and 1594, for the suppression of unruly clans.

The Civil War and Jacobite Risings

During the Scottish Civil War the Clan MacLaren fought for James Graham, 1st Marquis of Montrose, in support of Charles I of England at the Battle of Inveraray, Battle of Inverlochy (1645), Battle of Auldearn, Battle of Alford and the Battle of Kilsyth.

In 1689 the Clan MacLaren again fought for the Stuart cause, this time under John Graham, 1st Viscount Dundee, at the Battle of Killiecrankie.

Jacobite rising of 1715
During the Jacobite rising of 1715 the Clan MacLaren fought at the Battle of Sheriffmuir in support of the Jacobite cause.

Jacobite rising of 1745

During the Jacobite rising of 1745 the Clan MacLaren fought in support of the Jacobite cause at the Battle of Prestonpans and the Battle of Falkirk Muir where they were victorious on both occasions. The Clan was also present at the Battle of Culloden in 1746 where the Jacobite army met defeat. Donald MacLaren of Invernentie served in the role of Captain in the Appin Regiment.  He and the Appin Regiment were positioned in the center of the first line to the left of Lord George Murray's Atholl Brigade. He was injured at Culloden but escaped the field and rode back to Balqhidder and then on to Leny where he was injured during a skirmish with the Perthshire Militia on the 19th of July, 1746.  MacLaren was taken into custody along with Major David Stewart of Ballahallan, Captain Malcolm MacGregor of Concour, Sergeant King alias Macree (from Lord Murray's regiment) and three privates.  These men were transported to Stirling Castle and imprisoned.  He was treated by the prison physician for his wounds on the 20th of July and subsequently, on September 3, 1746, bound to a dragoon for transfer to Carlisle to stand trial for treason.

During the course of that transport MacLaren was freed or freed himself (the escape has been related both ways) and escaped by throwing himself off a cliff called the Devil's Beef Tub near Moffet.  Although the King's dragoons fired after him, the mist hid his movements and his escape was successful. He remained in hiding as a fugitive fugitive in Balquhidder until the amnesty of 1757.

There were McLarens in the other regiments as well during the Jacobite rising of 1745:
Lieutenants
Alexander McLaren, younger of East Haugh, Pitlochry, Strath Tay; 
Duncan McLaren, Brewer, Wester Invernentie, Balquhidder; 
 Orrott McLaren, Uncle to Younger of East Haugh, Pitlochry, Strath Tay
 
Other Ranks
Donald McLaren, Tenant, Dowally, Strath Tay; Duncan McLaren, Perthshire 3rd Battalion; James McLaren, Servant to Haugh of Killmorich, Strath Tay; John McLaren, Cottar, Rotmell, Strath Tay; Robert McLaren, (Whitefield's)

Crest Badge

The crest badge suitable for members of Clan to wear consists of the heraldic crest and slogan. The crest is: A lion's head erased Sable crowned with an antique crown of six (four visible) points, between two branches of laurel issuing from the Wreath at either side of the head both Proper Or. The slogan within the crest badge is CREAG AN TUIRC, which translates from Scottish Gaelic as "The Boars Rock".

Clan Badge
The clan badge badge is a laurel branch.

Tartan 

The MacLaren tartan colors are dark green, navy blue, yellow, red and black.

The MacLaren tartan was adopted by Scouts in 1921 for William de Bois Maclaren, who donated Gilwell Park to the Scouting Association. The MacLaren tartan was adopted by the Scouts as a way of honoring MacLaren for his donation to the Scouts and, as per World Organization of the Scout Movement, is worn by Scouts the world over.

Chiefly house of Clan Labhran

"The names from Lorn Mor to John (c1400) are taken from the genealogy of Clan Lawren quoted by Skene (Celtic, Vol. III, p 483) from a MS of 1467 based on a genealogy in the Book of Ballymote and from other medieval genealogies. Skene considers the genealogy reliable from Donald Og (contemporary of Kenneth MacAlpine) onwards. The derivation from Lord Mor is sound, as are most of the names, but for the period before 800 the different sources for the genealogies not only of the various chiefly houses, but even for the main royal line are confused and often contradictory. The line given is that which seems the most probable. The genealogy quoted by Skene ends about 1380-1400 with the names of the three brothers, John, Donald and Anichol Og, and so far no references have come to light to supply the missing names between John and Patrick Mor whose testament, recorded in the Dunblane Commissariat, shows that he died in 1544"

In 1957 Donald MacLaren of MacLaren and Achleskine successfully matriculated his Arms at the Lyon Court. He also purchased land in Balquhidder, including Creag an Tuirc (the "Boar's Rock"), the traditional rallying point of the Clan. The label "chiefless and landless" was finally removed.

Following his death, Donald's son, Donald succeeded as Chief in 1966.

See also 
 MacLaren (surname)
 McLaren (surname) 
 Maclaurin

Notes and references

Further reading

External links
  - Clan DNA project
  - Clan History presented through the use of citations and primary source examples
  - Website of the North American branch
  - Website of the Clan MacLaren Society

 
MacLaren